Lady Redgrave may refer to:

Rachel Kempson, wife of Sir Michael Redgrave
Ann Redgrave, wife of Sir Steve Redgrave